Bulduklu may refer to:
Bulduklu, Kozan, a village in the Kozan District of Adana Province, Turkey
Bulduklu, Amasya, a village in the District of Amasya, Amasya Province, Turkey

See also 
Bulduk (disambiguation)